Michael Behonick (born January 3, 1981 in Bohemia, New York) is an American retired soccer player who last played for the Puerto Rico Islanders of the USL First Division. Behonick is now an assistant coach at for the Pittsburgh Panthers men's soccer team.

Career

College
Behonick played college soccer at American University from 1999–2002, where he helped the Eagles reach the NCAA Tournament as a junior and earned second-team all-Patriot League honors the same season.

Professional
Behonick was selected 51st overall in the 2003 MLS SuperDraft by D.C. United but did not remain with the club. Instead, he began his professional career with the Charleston Battery of the A-League but did not see significant playing time until starting 10 matches in the 2005 season.

In 2004, the Battery sent him on loan to the Harrisburg City Islanders where he played seven games. In 2006, he was signed by New York Red Bulls as the team's third-choice goalkeeper behind Tony Meola and Jon Conway. The Red Bulls sent him on loan to the Long Island Rough Riders before releasing him at the end of the season. In 2007, he joined Crystal Palace Baltimore after passing their trial in early 2007. He began the season as first choice goalkeeper, but after some heavy defeats found himself dropped in favor of Brian Rowland.

Half way through the season he was signed by the Islanders to serve as second string goalie behind Josh Saunders. In January 2008 he suffered an injury to his leg when in camp with the Puerto Rico national team, sidelining him for five months and ruining his chance of becoming first goalkeeper for the Puerto Rico Islanders after Josh Saunders left. In July 2008 he rejoined the Puerto Rico Islanders as backup to Bill Gaudette.

Honors

Club

Puerto Rico Islanders
USL First Division Championship
 Runners-up (1): 2008
Commissioner's Cup
 Winners (1): 2008
CFU Club Championship
 Runner-up (1): 2009

References

External links
 Charleston Battery bio

1981 births
Living people
American Eagles men's soccer players
American soccer players
Association football goalkeepers
American University alumni
USL First Division players
USL Second Division players
Charleston Battery players
Crystal Palace Baltimore players
Puerto Rico Islanders players
Long Island Rough Riders players
Penn FC players
Expatriate footballers in Puerto Rico
A-League (1995–2004) players
Soccer players from New York (state)
D.C. United draft picks